The 2005 Schleswig-Holstein state election was held on 20 February 2005 to elect the members of the Landtag of Schleswig-Holstein. The incumbent coalition government of the Social Democratic Party (SPD) and The Greens led by Minister-President Heide Simonis was defeated. After a failed attempt to invest a minority SPD–Green government supported by the South Schleswig Voters' Association (SSW), the SPD agreed to join a grand coalition with the Christian Democratic Union (CDU). CDU leader Peter Harry Carstensen was subsequently elected Minister-President.

Campaign and issues
Surveys before the election indicated that most voters considered high unemployment in Germany and Schleswig-Holstein to be the key issue of the campaign. Pre-election polls indicated that the personal popularity of Heide Simonis was still high, though, and that the SPD–Green coalition had the support of a plurality of voters. However, the unpopularity of the federal SPD and the Hartz IV reforms appeared to have taken a toll.

Parties
The table below lists parties represented in the previous Landtag of Schleswig-Holstein.

Opinion polling

Election result

|-
| colspan=8| 
|-
! colspan="2" | Party
! Votes
! %
! +/-
! Seats 
! +/-
! Seats %
|-
| bgcolor=| 
| align=left | Christian Democratic Union (CDU)
| align=right| 576,095
| align=right| 40.2
| align=right| 5.0
| align=right| 30
| align=right| 3
| align=right| 43.5
|-
| bgcolor=| 
| align=left | Social Democratic Party (SPD)
| align=right| 554,879
| align=right| 38.7
| align=right| 4.4
| align=right| 29
| align=right| 12
| align=right| 42.0
|-
| bgcolor=| 
| align=left | Free Democratic Party (FDP)
| align=right| 94,935
| align=right| 6.6
| align=right| 1.0
| align=right| 4
| align=right| 3
| align=right| 5.8
|-
| bgcolor=| 
| align=left | Alliance 90/The Greens (Grüne)
| align=right| 89,387
| align=right| 6.2
| align=right| 0.0
| align=right| 4
| align=right| 1
| align=right| 5.8
|-
| bgcolor=| 
| align=left | South Schleswig Voters' Association (SSW)
| align=right| 51,920
| align=right| 3.6
| align=right| 0.5
| align=right| 2
| align=right| 1
| align=right| 2.9
|-
! colspan=8|
|-
| bgcolor=| 
| align=left | National Democratic Party (NPD)
| align=right| 27,676
| align=right| 1.9
| align=right| 0.9
| align=right| 0
| align=right| ±0
| align=right| 0
|-
| bgcolor=|
| align=left | Others
| align=right| 39,913
| align=right| 2.8
| align=right| 
| align=right| 0
| align=right| ±0
| align=right| 0
|-
! align=right colspan=2| Total
! align=right| 1,434,805
! align=right| 100.0
! align=right| 
! align=right| 69
! align=right| 20
! align=right| 
|-
! align=right colspan=2| Voter turnout
! align=right| 
! align=right| 66.5
! align=right| 3.0
! align=right| 
! align=right| 
! align=right| 
|}

Outcome
After the election, the SPD–Green coalition no longer commanded a majority of the Landtag. The SSW announced that although it would not enter a coalition, it saw more common ground with the SPD than the CDU. Minister-President Simonis proceeded to form an SPD–Green coalition based on an agreement with the SSW backing it.

On 17 March, the vote to invest the government failed, with the secret ballot tying 34–34. It is not known who abstained, though it is widely believed to have been a representative of the SPD. Since the coalition had failed, the SPD was forced to negotiate a grand coalition agreement with the CDU, capitulating to the CDU's demand that CDU leader Peter Harry Carstensen replace Simonis as Minister-President.

References

Elections in Schleswig-Holstein
2005 elections in Germany
February 2005 events in Europe